Juan Ignacio Acosta Cabrera (born 8 March 1985) is Paraguayan-born Chilean footballer who plays as a attacking midfielder.

Career
As a youth player, Acosta was with Colo-Colo and Huachipato in Chile and Racing in Argentina. Having played the most part of his career in Argentina, he made his debut playing for Platense at the age of 16. He also has played for San Martín de Tucumán, Los Andes, Atlanta, Boca Unidos, Acassuso, Defensores Unidos, Dock Sud, Luján, Atlético Laguna Blanca, Deportivo Merlo, Sacachispas and San Martín de Burzaco.

In the 2005–06 season, he won the Primera División B along with Platense, getting promotion to the Primera Nacional. In the 2007–08, he won the Primera B Nacional alon with San Martín de Tucumán, getting promotion to Primera División.

In addition, he had brief steps with Fernando de la Mora and Sport Colombia in his country of birth, Alianza Lima in Peru, and Lota Schwager in Chile.
"

Personal life
He naturalized Chilean by descent since his father is Chilean.

Honours
Platense
 Primera División B: 

San Martín de Tucumán
 Primera B Nacional: 2007–08

References

External links
 
 
 Juan Ignacio Acosta at SoloAscenso.com.ar 
 Juan Ignacio Acosta at FutbolPasion.com 

1985 births
Living people
People from Misiones Department
Paraguayan footballers
Sportspeople of Chilean descent
Paraguayan expatriate footballers
Paraguayan emigrants to Chile
Citizens of Chile through descent
Chilean footballers
Chilean expatriate footballers
Club Atlético Platense footballers
Fernando de la Mora footballers
Club Alianza Lima footballers
Sport Colombia footballers
San Martín de Tucumán footballers
Club Atlético Los Andes footballers
Club Atlético Atlanta footballers
Boca Unidos footballers
Club Atlético Acassuso footballers
Defensores Unidos footballers
Lota Schwager footballers
Sportivo Dock Sud players
Club Luján footballers
Deportivo Merlo footballers
Sacachispas Fútbol Club players
San Martín de Burzaco footballers
Primera B Metropolitana players
Paraguayan División Intermedia players
Peruvian Primera División players
Primera Nacional players
Primera C Metropolitana players
Primera B de Chile players
Torneo Argentino B players
Naturalized citizens of Chile
Chilean expatriate sportspeople in Argentina
Chilean expatriate sportspeople in Peru
Paraguayan expatriate sportspeople in Argentina
Paraguayan expatriate sportspeople in Peru
Expatriate footballers in Peru
Expatriate footballers in Argentina
Association football forwards